The Lost is a 2006 American psychological horror film that was written and directed by Chris Sivertson based on the Jack Ketchum novel of the same name, which in turn was inspired by the true story of serial killer Charles Schmid. It was produced by Lucky McKee. The film stars Marc Senter as charismatic teen sociopath Ray Pye. Senter won best actor awards from both Screamfest and Fantaspoa film festivals. He was also nominated for a Fangoria Chainsaw Award. Supporting cast include Shay Astar, Alex Frost, Michael Bowen, and Robin Sydney. The movie had its world premiere at the SXSW Film Festival with a limited theatrical release following shortly after.

Synopsis
19-year-old Ray Pye decides to murder two young women. His friends, Jen and Tim, witness the murder and help him cover it up.

Four years later, Ray has never been arrested for the crime. Detective Charlie Schilling and his ex-partner, Ed Anderson, know that Ray did it but they could not prove it. Charlie figures it is about time they did something about it. Meanwhile, Ray has met his match in Katherine Wallace, a new girl in town. She and Ray are a potentially explosive combination. Throw in the fact that Ed is having a summer fling with Sally Richmond - a girl young enough to be his daughter. And Sally has just gotten a job at the motel that Ray manages. Ray has his eye on her.

Charlie and Ed never found the gun that Ray used to murder the women at the campground. That rifle, as well as a handgun, are hidden behind the mirror in Ray's bathroom. Ray can only be pushed so far. The time will come when he takes the mirror off the wall and shows everyone who is in charge.

Cast

References

External links
 
 
 LA Times review of The Lost
 Marc Senter interview MovieWeb
 Dread Central review of The Lost

2006 films
American psychological horror films
2000s psychological horror films
2006 horror films
Films about murderers
Films directed by Chris Sivertson
Crime horror films
American horror thriller films
2000s horror thriller films
American psychological drama films
2000s psychological drama films
American psychological thriller films
2006 psychological thriller films
American horror drama films
2006 drama films
2000s English-language films
2000s American films